Sheila Fortson (born August 22, 1983, in Philadelphia, Pennsylvania) is an American television journalist, radio host and media/communications specialist (not to be confused with the actress/singer with the same name, who looks very much like her). Fortson formerly worked as an Entertainment and Community Affairs reporter for The Lehigh Valley's Service Electric Cable TV 2 News, located in Bethlehem, Pennsylvania, and as the principal host of a popular radio show for women The Ladies Room with Sheila & Shay, on WIFI 1460 AM in Burlington, New Jersey. She currently works in Public Relations and as a freelance television host. To date she is noted as the first and only African American on-air reporter to have worked at SECTV in the station's history.

Biography 
Early life and education 

Fortson was born in West Philadelphia, Pennsylvania. She graduated from Temple University's school of Journalism, which is noted as a top journalism school in the country.

Career 
While working at her university's student-run station, Temple Update as a student producer, Fortson was mentored by former WTXF-TV Fox 29 Philadelphia anchor Tracey Matisak, who convinced her to work in front of the camera. Fortson often credits Tracey as being her inspiration, and being the first African American woman she remembers seeing on television as a child. After finishing at Temple, Fortson began working as a post-grad intern at Blue Ridge Cable TV 13, in Lehighton, Pennsylvania. Following her internship at TV 13, Sheila was hired as a reporter at SECTV2 News.

In addition to her daily reporting, Fortson provided the Lehigh Valley with annual 10-day live coverage of the largest music festival in the nation, "Musikfest". She has also covered Valley visits from then-presidential candidate Barack Obama, his wife Michelle Obama, and high-profile journalists like Larry Kane, and NBC Correspondent Lisa Myers. She was widely known throughout the SECTV viewing area for her coverage of annual parades alongside the Valley's popular Mr. Paul., and her community based entertainment and feature style reporting.

Following her time at SECTV, Fortson opened a women's clothing boutique, "Hidden Glam", and began working in Public Relations. She continues to work in television, freelancing as a host for shows like "Food For Thought". She is also the creator and host of "12 Minute Mom".

Fortson currently hosts the INSIGHTS Video Edition, an online insurance news program for the National Council on Compensation Insurance (NCCI), in Boca Raton, FL.

Awards and affiliations 

Fortson is a member of the National Association of Black Journalists, the National Council of Negro Women, the National Congress of Black Women, and one of the four prestigious and exclusive African American sororities, Sigma Gamma Rho sorority. She has been recognized by the Philadelphia branch of the Salvation Army for her organization of a holiday toy drive for needy children, and she has received numerous recognitions for community and youth outreach. Fortson is also the founder of a women's volunteer group known as "Sisters Who Serve". She has been featured in Lehigh Valley Magazine, Today's Black Woman Magazine, Glamour Magazine online, The Philadelphia Daily News, Sadiddy Magazine, and numerous blogs. Her clothing boutique was voted a Top Shopping Destination in Montgomery County by MontCo Happening Digital Magazine, and Fortson was voted as a top local celebrity via community votes for the MontCo Happening Hot List. She and her husband were featured in the Spring/Summer 2009 issue of the Temple University Alumni Magazine, the Temple Review, in an article about Temple graduates who fell in love and got married.

Personal 

Fortson is married to Muhammed Williams, also a Temple University graduate. Williams works in the IT industry as a software executive and business analyst. Fortson is the cousin of former NBA power forward Danny Fortson, and the sister-in-law of former NFL and Arena League football player Jafar Williams, who now coaches at the collegiate level for Temple University. Fortson and her husband have two daughters.

American television journalists
American women television journalists
Living people
1983 births
21st-century American women